Panthoibi is a goddess associated with civilization, courage, fertility, handicraft, love, victory, warfare and wisdom in the mythology and religion of Ancient Kangleipak (early Manipur). She is a consort of the God Nongpok Ningthou.
She is considered to be one of the divine incarnations of Leimarel Sidabi and is also identified as a form of Goddess Nongthang Leima.
She is worshipped mainly by the Meitei people in Manipur, Assam, Tripura, Bangladesh and Myanmar.

The personality of Panthoibi and other Meitei goddesses like Emoinu and Phouoibi depict as well as influence the courage, independence, righteousness and social honour of Meitei women.

History 
According to the Panthoibi Khongul, the worship of goddess Panthoibi began in the era of the Khaba dynasty.

In 1100 AD, the Loyumba Shinyen mentions the Heishnam clan's service to goddess Panthoibi. The text addresses her as the most adored Meetei goddess.

In the 17th century, Panthoibi appeared as a war goddess riding on a tiger. The Cheitharol Kumbaba's first record of the building of a temple of Panthoibi was in the year 1686. The same text's first record of the making of her statue was in the year 1699.

In the 18th century, there was a decline in the worship of Panthoibi mirrored a rise of Vaishnavism in Manipur. Hindu King Garib Niwaj Pamheiba (1709-1748) pulled down her temples and broke her statues, and from the 18th century onwards, Panthoibi was treated as a manifestation of the Hindu goddess Durga or as her incarnation or as her manifestation. The identity of Panthoibi was changed to that of Hindu goddess Durga. She was worshipped for five days in September – October.

No more temples to Panthoibi were built from 1700 until the modern era came. Since 1960s, the worship of Panthoibi has increased, beginning to replace the worship of Durga.

Attributes and epithets 
Goddess Panthoibi is regarded as self-confident and self-conscious with female pride. Legend says she has many metamorphosis (forms). One example is Phouoibi (goddess of grains). Panthoibi is regarded the ruling deity of birth and death.

Panthoibi as a priestess goddess 
According to the Anoirol text, goddess Panthoibi is a personification of Khabi Lengnao Mombi. The latter is the ancient amaibi (lit. priestess). Different personifications of Panthoibi manifest differently according to different texts. Panthoibi was regarded as a pre-historical Maibi. She is also regarded as an incarnation of goddess Nongthang Leima, another goddess amaibi.

Panthoibi as a goddess of game 
Panthoibi is a ruling deity of the Kang game. Kang is a popular indoor game of Meitei tradition in Manipur. Kang players pray to her before and during the game. People believe that one cannot do his or her best at the game without her blessings.

Panthoibi as a patron goddess of potters 
Goddess Panthoibi is the patron deity of all the potters. She gifted the pot-making art to the women of Manipur. She was taught the art of pottery by goddess Leimarel Sidabi before her disappearance. She has another mythology about this.

Panthoibi as the goddess of death and fertility 

Goddess Panthoibi has legendary connections to Haoreibi Shampubi (alias Haoreima). Haoreibi Shampubi is a woman from the hills. She was killed while arranging to meet her lover. She turned into a tortured spirit. She is regarded as an incarnation of Panthoibi. So, the goddess became associated with death and fertility.

Panthoibi as the goddess of diseases and illnesses 
Panthoibi reacts badly to bad actions of the humans. If a person has spit nearby Panthoibi's shrine, he or she will not be able to turn his or her neck. It could be healed only by a maiba. For this, the maiba will perform a ritual.

Panthoibi as the goddess of spinning and weaving

Learned from a spider 
Goddess Panthoibi got inspired by a spider. It was making cobwebs in a corner. From the spider, the art of spinning and weaving was learned.
Panthoibi imitated the pattern of weaving of the spider. Later, she introduced the art of weaving.

Learned from another goddess 
In another legendary account, Panthoibi was taught the art of weaving by Goddess Leishambi. Leishambi is the goddess of creation.

Mythology 
Panthoibi is a lady of surpassing beauty. She is a daughter of a Meitei king. Many kings and princes wanted to marry her. King Shapaiba was from the western parts of the valley of Ancient Kangleipak (Antique Manipur). He was one among her suitors. He promised her to construct good roads, beautiful bridges, spacious house and fish ponds. Every promises were just for the sake of her. Despite all these, she did not accept his proposal. Finally, Panthoibi was married to Tarang Khoinucha (alias Taram Khoinucha). Her mortal husband is the son of King Khaba Sokchrongba and Queen Teknga of the Khaba dynasty. Her marriage ceremony was an outstanding one. Bridge poles were made of iron. The planks were made of silver plates. The side railings were made of golden rods.

Meeting Nongpok Ningthou 
Goddess Panthoibi met God Nongpok Ningthou (alias Angoupa Kainou Chingsangsompa) for the first time when she was wandering in the open meadows, bathing and sporting in the cool waters of the running river. She was attracted to his handsome looks and towering personality. The two fell in love at first sight. She was proposed by Nongpok Ningthou to elope with him. But the already married goddess did not accept the instant proposal very soon. It was because it was not even five days passed after her wedding. She insisted him to spend some time.

Panthoibi and Nongpok Ningthou secretly met many times. This causes the in-laws of Panthoibi to have suspicion over her. Her mortal husband tried to win her heart many times. But all of these attempts failed. Panthoibi and Nongpok Ningthou finally eloped. They wore the attires of the Tangkhuls.

The two divine lovers ultimately got united on the sun-washed slopes of the Nongmaiching Hills. Their happy union was celebrated with dances and music by the gods (by the Langmai people and not the gods in another version). These celebration gave birth to the Lai Haraoba festival.

Another version 
In another version of the story, Panthoibi first met Nongpok Ningthou when she was helping her father at jhum cultivation (Slash-and-burn). The two fell in love at first sight without any talks. But Panthoibi married another man against her will. She left her husband's house to search for her true lover. Nongpok Ningthou also left his home for the same purpose. The two lovers met at the Kangla. Kangla became the place of their divine union. So, it is considered to be a special place of coronation of the Meitei kings.

Panthoibi and the Sun God 
According to the Numit Kappa text (c. 1st century), two suns shone in the ancient sky. One was wounded by an archer hero (many men in some version). The two brother suns fled from their positions. They hid for ten long days. So, the world remain in darkness. No men could work. Crops perished. Cattles died. So, the ten godly kings (or kingly gods) approached to many divinities. They requested each to plead with the Sun God. None succeeded to do so. Finally, the ten gods came to Princess Panthoibi. It was because she knew many mysteries and secrets. So, she showed them magical ceremonies to lure the Sun God. They did the same to the Sun God. The unwounded Sun God returned. But the wounded one never returned.

Panthoibi and the weaving spider 
Once Panthoibi saw a spider. It was producing fine threads. It was also making cobwebs (spiderwebs). From this, she got the knowledge. She started the art of weaving. The divine feminine association of the art signifies the association of females with weaving.

Pottery and Human Civilization 

After the creation of the human beings, Panthoibi made their settlements and habitats. Human started eating and drinking. Panthoibi realised the need of vessels to store food and water. So, she started making pots. In the beginning, she lacked the idea how to make a pot. Later, she looked around. She saw a flower - Nura Khudonglei (Malabar melastome). She imitated the shape and the design of the flower. Then, she produced a pot. Since then, human civilization starting making pots for cooking food and drinking water.

Ancient texts-ꯄꯨꯌꯥ

In ancient Meitei religion, Goddess Panthoibi is given one hundred and fifteen divine names, describing her varying attributes. Her description is mentioned in several ancient texts including Panthoibi Khongul as well as Panthoibi Mingkheilol.

Panthoibi Khongul
Here's a description from the Panthoibi Khongul, an ancient text:-
“O Tampha, your measure reaches the sky; an everlasting radiance marks your presence; you are the source of all living beings… both birth and death are your handiwork, you are the repository of all wealth; you can unravel the mystery of human souls and keep both the earth and the heaven jointly linked; you give shelter to the souls of living beings, keep them as beads are strung together; you are the highest of all goddesses and the most munificent in bestowing blessings… both the striped tiger and the white horse are your chargers; you can gallop on tall grass tops without even leaving a trace… you are born of the noblest royal family, are unmindful of your brothers and parents as disposed to doing only what pleases you… you are the very embodiment of beauty but still indulge in constant baths at every fount and embellish your tender body, use all the fruits of the Langmāi Hills as unguents, always neatly comb your tresses of hair, skitter lightly with your drapery loosely hung on your full blossomed body; your teeth are like pearls, your lips are as red as the wild tayāl in the bamboo grove; your fingers are soft as those of a neonate; your name is Panthoipi as no parents or brothers can exercise control over you; you appropriated the name by yourself ere anyone confers it on you; you have an unfettered soul, nowhere can you keep yourself confined, you have as many appearances as you please to change your abode… you lord over the vast empty vault, took your birth with the flash of lightning… you are the receptacle of all knowledge… no opponent can confront you in the stricken field, you shine more than the glories of all divine beings put together… you emerged with the flash of summer lightning before dewdrops got condensed in the sky, before sound itself could be audible and before the azure welkin could yet cover its vast expanse… you are effulgent in the open sky like one thousand suns… all the divine beings emanate from you… the wide universe is your creation… you take fancy more to lively frolics that engaging your intelligence… you pervade all the directions…”
- Panthoibi Khongul.

Worship 
Panthoibi is mainly worshipped by the Heisnam family of Meitei ethnicity. So, she is also known as Heisnam Lairembi (lit. Goddess of the Heisnam).

Association with other goddesses 
Panthoibi is regarded as one of the divine incarnations of Goddess Leimarel Sidabi. She is also regarded as an incarnation of goddess Nongthang Leima. She also has many forms including Phouoibi (goddess of grains). Goddess Haoreibi Shampubi (alias Haoreima) is also regarded as an incarnation of Panthoibi.

Festivals

Panthoibi Iratpa 

Panthoibi Iratpa (Panthoibi Eratpa) is a religious festival dedicated to goddess Panthoipi. It is celebrated every year.

Lai Haraoba 

Panthoibi and Nongpok Ningthou are at the core of Lai Haraoba festival. Their legend finds an important place in the lyrical literature of Ancient Manipur.

In Art forms

Panthoibi Jagoi 
Panthoibi Jagoi is a duet dance form. It is accompanied by a song of love. It is sung by a maibi and a Pena Khongba (Pena player). It has reference to the love of Panthoibi and Nongpok Ningthou. It also depicts the process of weaving.

Panthoibi Sheishak 
Panthoibi Sheishak is a song sung in the Lai Haraoba festival. It is performed by the Pena players. It retells the story of Panthoibi searching for her beloved Nongpok Ningthou.

It is one of the 9 singing styles (tunes) sung in the Lai Haraoba.

Tangkhul Nurabi Loutaba 
Tangkhul Nurabi Loutaba is an enactment of the repartee between Tangkhul Pakhang (an incarnation of Nongpok Ningthou) and Tangkhul Nurabi (an incarnation of Panthoibi). The two repartee players dress up in Tangkhul Naga costumes of farming in the field. This is performed on the last night of the Kanglei Haraoba (one of the 4 forms of Lai Haraoba festival).

Namesakes 
The Panthoibi Emporium is a trading center in New Delhi, India.
The Panthoibi Housing Finance Company Limited is a housing financial company in Imphal.
The Panthoibi Manipur Handicrafts Emporium is an emporium in Delhi, India. It mainly sells handmade silk products from Manipur.

References

Bibliography 
 Ariba Manipuri Sahityagee Saklon by Nabachandra, Polem
 Chinglon Laihui by Manglem Meitei, Lairenjam
 Erat Laisol by Singh, Khulem Chandrashekhar
 Khannashi Neinnashi Leishatpa Puya by Manglem Meitei,l
 Lairemjam Manglem Gi Lai Haraoba by Manglem Meitei, Lairenjam
 Langgol Chinggoirol by Singh, Kulchandra Ngariyambam
 Manipuree Funggawaree Part 1 by Singh, Kabrabam Neelakanta
 Manipuree Funggawaree Part 2 by Singh, Kabrabam Neelakanta
 Yek Taretki Meihourol by Manglem Meitei,l
 Yek Taret Ki Meihouron by Manglem Meitei,l

External links 

 E-PAO, Panthoibi
 INTERNET ARCHIVE, Panthoibi
 Learners' Manipuri-English dictionary, Panthoibi

Abundance goddesses
Agricultural goddesses
Arts goddesses
Asian goddesses
Beauty goddesses
Crafts goddesses
Creator goddesses
Dance goddesses
Death goddesses
Destroyer goddesses
Extramarital relationships
Fertility goddesses
Food goddesses
Food deities
Fortune goddesses
Harvest goddesses
Health goddesses
Justice goddesses
Knowledge goddesses
Leima
Love and lust goddesses
Magic goddesses
Maintenance goddesses
Marriage goddesses
Medicine goddesses
Meitei deities
Mountain goddesses
Music and singing goddesses
Names of God in Sanamahism
Nature goddesses
Pastoral goddesses
Peace goddesses
Temporary marriages
Trickster goddesses
War goddesses
Wisdom goddesses